Traugott Buhre (21 June 1929 – 26 July 2009) was a German actor.

Buhre was born at Insterburg, East Prussia, Germany (today Chernyakhovsk, Russia) the son of a Lutheran Pastor. His parents divorced in his childhood and after World War II he started his actor's education at the stage school of Hanover.

Buhre appeared at the Frankonian Theater of Wetzhausen. He was a member of the ensembles of the Badisches Staatstheater Karlsruhe, the Staatstheater Stuttgart, the Schauspielhaus Bochum, Thalia-Theater Hamburg, Deutsches Schauspielhaus Hamburg, the Schaubühne in Berlin, Burgtheater in Vienna and the Berliner Ensemble.

His last stage appearance was in Thomas Bernhard's Immanuel Kant at the Schauspielhaus Zürich in 2009.

Buhre was popular among a wider audience for his TV roles in Derrick and Tatort and in the German movie production Anatomy.

Buhre was married twice and had seven children.

Filmography

References

External links
 
 

1929 births
2009 deaths
20th-century German male actors
21st-century German male actors
German male film actors
German male stage actors
German male television actors
People from East Prussia
People from Insterburg